An incomplete list of films produced in Brazil in the 1940s. For an alphabetical list of films currently on Wikipedia see :Category:Brazilian films

References

External links
 Brazilian film at the Internet Movie Database

1940s
Brazilian
Films